Neomphaliones is a subclass of deepwater limpets (marine gastropods), in the class Gastropoda.

Taxonomy
According to revised taxonomy of the Gastropoda by Bouchet & Rocroi et al. 2017, this subclass consists only of the following orders: 
 Cocculinida
 Neomphalida

References

External links

Gastropods
 
Mollusc subclasses